Al-Diriyah Club is a Saudi Arabian football club based in Diriyah. Founded in 1976, the club competes in the MS League , the second tier of Saudi football. Al-Diriyah play their home games at the Prince Turki bin Abdul Aziz Stadium in Riyadh. Al-Diriyah have won the Saudi Second Division once in 2013 and finished as runners-up once in 2020.

The club was founded by Saad Al-Rashed and Abdulrahman bin Sarye'e and its first president was Abdullah Al-Jadaie. The club's current president is Khaled Al-Habshan, who was named president in July 2021.

Honours
Saudi Second Division (Level 3)
Winners (1): 2012–13
Runners-up (1): 2019–20

Saudi Third Division (Level 4)
Runners-up (1): 2006–07

Current squad 
As of 1 July 2021:

Sponsorship
Nike
Herfy Restaurant

References

Diriyah
Diriyah
Diriyah
Diriyah